Ida F. Pulis Lathrop (1859–1937) was an American painter. She primarily worked on portraits, still life and landscapes as subjects. Lathrop was based in Albany, New York.

About 
She was born on October 27, 1859 as Ida F. Pulis in Troy, New York to Catherine (née Sheffér) and Abraham William Pulis. She married Cyprus Clark Lathrop in 1885. Together they had two daughters that became artists, Gertrude K. Lathrop, and Dorothy P. Lathrop. Ida Pullis Lathrop was a self-taught artist.

She died on September 7, 1937 in her home in Albany, she is buried in Albany Rural Cemetery.

Lathrop has work in the museum collection at Albany Institute of History and Art, Smithsonian American Art Museum, among others.

References

External links 
 
Ida Pulis Lathrop on AskArt.com

1859 births
1937 deaths
Painters from New York (state)
People from Albany County, New York
20th-century American painters
20th-century American women artists
Burials at Albany Rural Cemetery